The Beverage Testing Institute (BTI) is a marketing service company that provides reviews for spirits, wines, and beers. It uses numerical scores and publishes books of its test results.

The company's beer marketing program, the World Beer Championships, was founded in 1994.

Reviews
The company rates spirits, wines and beers. It does not accept advertising from any company that submits their products for review. The judging ratings range from 96 to 100 for superlative to 80 and below for not recommended. Jerald O’Kennard, Director of the Beverage Testing Institute, said that 94 is an extremely good score, and unusually high. They use a tasting lab in Chicago. Testing methods minimize external factors and maximize the concentration of the panelist. Taste tests are practically the same time every weekday morning. All of the panelists are professional guest tasters who are retailers, restaurateurs, or prominent writers.

Books
The company published the book Beverage Testing Institute's Buying Guide to Beer. The book is a guide to beers throughout the world. The breweries and brands are arranged in alphabetical order according to geographic location. There are also notes on the appearance, aroma, and taste for every beer that is rated and there is information on beer styles. The company also published the book Buying Guide to Imported Wines. The book has evaluations of styles, vintages, and producers cover 2,500 wines from 22 countries in Europe, Latin America, Africa, and Russia. The best-scoring wines are categorized by name, region, description, and price.

Scores and their meaning
The scores are translated onto a modified 100-point scale. The five "bands" below more accurately reflect the quality of products in today's market. It roughly corresponds to a five-star system:

96–100—Superlative
90–95—Exceptional
85–89—Highly Recommended
80–84—Recommended
less than 80—Not Recommended
Best Buy. Wines or spirits that provide uncommon value.
Cellar Selection. This is a wine that they believe will improve significantly with at least three to five years of age.

See also
Spirits ratings
Blind tasting
Court of Master Sommeliers

References

External links
 Beverage Testing Institute

Drinking culture